The 1910 All England Open Badminton Championships was a badminton tournament held at the Royal Horticultural Hall, Westminster, England from March 2 to March 5, 1910.

After seven years at the London Rifle Brigade's headquarters the Championships switched to a new venue at the Royal Horticultural Hall which provided five courts. There were just six entries for the women's singles, which saw Meriel Lucas win her sixth singles title. Frank Chesterton successfully defended his singles title.

Final results

Men's singles

Women's singles

Men's doubles

Women's doubles

Mixed doubles

+alias

References

All England Open Badminton Championships
All England
All England Open Badminton Championships in London
All England Championships
All England Badminton Championships
All England Badminton Championships